Round Harbour was located south west of Wesleyville, Newfoundland and Labrador.

See also
List of communities in Newfoundland and Labrador

Populated coastal places in Canada
Populated places in Newfoundland and Labrador